The Canglangpuian age is a Chinese regional subdivision of the Cambrian, corresponding approximately to Cambrian Stage 4.

References

Cambrian geochronology
Cambrian Series 2